Manteiga-de-garrafa (butter-from-a-bottle) or manteiga-da-terra (butter of the land) are terms in northeastern Brazil to refer to a clarified butter product, similar to Indian ghee. The product is also known as manteiga de gado (cattle butter) and manteiga de cozinha (kitchen butter).

Manteiga de garrafa is a dairy product made from the cream of cows' milk. Salt may also be added. Some recipes for making manteiga de garrafa include a step prior to cooking in which the congealed cream is washed in cold water. The cooking process separates the cream into two components, the manteiga (butter) and the "borra" (a watery precipitate). The manteiga is separated from the borra by filtration, and then placed in bottles. The finished product is almost pure fat, with a low water activity. Accordingly, it is inhospitable to microbial growth and can be kept at room temperature.

Manteiga de garrafa is a yellow-orange, viscous liquid which may be opaque or semi-translucent. It is strongly flavored, with flavors of cheese, fish, rancidity, and barnyard composing part of the flavor profile. Manteiga de garrafa is a characteristic part of the cuisine of the northeast of Brazil, particularly the Sertão. In cooking, the product is used in much the same way as ordinary butter.

The borra that is removed during processing is also eaten.  It can be eaten with bread, or used as an ingredient in farofa, carne-de-sol, feijão verde, and in cooking fried eggs or cassava (macaxeira).

Manteiga de garrafa is a product of artesanal or small-scale manufacturing, as well as home production, and its quality and flavor can be variable. There are no fixed manufacturing standards that must be met in order to call a product "manteiga de garrafa". The product is produced and distributed by means of street fairs, town markets, supermarkets, restaurants and small shops.

See also 

 Ghee
 Butter

References

Further reading
Quarterly bulletin: Boletim trimestral, Volume 5, Issue 1. Govt. Print. Press., 1963. 

Brazilian cuisine
Butter
Cooking fats